Bachelor Father is a British sitcom starring Ian Carmichael that aired for two series from 1970 to 1971. It was written by Richard Waring.

Background
Bachelor Father is loosely based on the life of Peter Lloyd Jeffock. Jeffock was a bachelor who had fostered twelve children. He later wrote an autobiography called Only Uncle. Richard Waring, who wrote Bachelor Father, based some of the plots on incidents told in Only Uncle. Waring said that he would have kept more to Only Uncle, but many of the true stories were so far-fetched, he thought the public wouldn't believe them.

Cast
Ian Carmichael – Peter Lamb
Sonia Graham – Mrs Rathbone
Diana King – Norah
Ian Johnson – Ben
Briony McRoberts – Anna
Michael Douglas – Freddie
Beverley Simons – Jane
Joan Hickson – Mrs Pugsley
Gerald Flood – Harry (series 1)
Colin Gordon – Mr Gibson (series 1)
Pauline Yates – Mrs Moore (series 1 and 1970 special)
Jack May – Mr Moore (series 1)
Rona Anderson – Mary (series 1)
Roland Pickering – Donald (series 1 and 1970 special)
Andrew Bowen – Donald (series 2)
Kevin Moran – Christopher (series 2)Gerry Cowper – Jo (series 2)Jacqueline Cowper – Ginny (series 2)Plot
Peter Lamb is a rich man who has always wanted a family, but failed to sustain any relationships. In the first episode, he decides to foster children. He then fosters a variety of diverse children

Survival status
22 episodes in total were produced; because of the BBC's wiping policy in the 1970s, only one episode still exists in its original colour form, the first one:  "Family Feeling". The other existing episodes below, indicated with an asterisk, survive as 16mm black and white telerecordings.

Series One (1970)Family Feeling (17 September 70)*All in the Family (24 September 70)*First of the Many (1 October 70)The Normal Front (8 October 70)Birthday Boys (15 October 70)*The Peter Pan Syndrome (22 October 70)A Little Learning (29 October 70)A Spot of Natural Expression (5 November 70)A Man's Man About The House (12 November 70)A Kind of Love-In (19 November 70)Time To Go Home (26 November 70)Love They Neighbour (3 December 70)Feminine Company (10 December 70)

Special (1970)
Short special as part of Christmas Night with the Stars (25 December 70)

Series Two (1971)Pet Ideas (16 September 71)*House Guest (23 September 71)*Partners in Crime (30 September 71)*Economy Class (7 October 71)*Not in Front of the Children (14 October 71)*Name This Child (21 October 71)*Gently Does It (28 October 71)*Woman About The House (4 November 71)*Peter Lamb – This Is Your Anniversary (11 November 71)*

Special (1971)
Short special as part of Christmas Night with the Stars'' (25 December 71)

Footnotes

References
Mark Lewisohn, "Radio Times Guide to TV Comedy", BBC Worldwide Ltd, 2003
British TV Comedy Guide for this programme

External links
 

1970 British television series debuts
1971 British television series endings
1970s British sitcoms
BBC television sitcoms
Lost BBC episodes
English-language television shows